Maly Yaloman (Kıñıraar) is a rural locality (a selo) in Ongudaysky District, the Altai Republic, Russia. The population was 219 as of 2016. There are 4 streets.

Geography 
Maly Yaloman is located 60 km southeast of Onguday (the district's administrative centre) by road. Inya is the nearest rural locality.

References 

Rural localities in Ongudaysky District